Pseudovates arizonae, common name Arizona unicorn mantis, is a species of praying mantis native to North America and is only found in the state of Arizona. At least three other related Pseudovates are found in Mexico, and a similar-looking species from the genus Phyllovates is found in Texas.

Background
This species is easy to tell from the similar-looking Texas unicorn mantis Phyllovates chlorophaea because it has lobes on the legs and sides of the abdomen. It is also more brightly colored and averages smaller in the wild (captive specimens are more variable due to rearing differences).

See also
Arizona mantis
Unicorn mantis
List of mantis genera and species

References

Mantidae
Mantodea of North America
Endemic fauna of Arizona
Insects of the United States
Insects described in 1935